Elipsocus annulatus is a species of Psocoptera from the Elipsocidae family that can be found in Austria, France, Germany, Italy, Spain, and Switzerland.

References

Elipsocidae
Insects described in 1954
Psocoptera of Europe